Adamello (in local dialect Adamèl) is a mountain in Lombardy, Italy. It is located in Valcamonica, Lombardy (Province of Brescia). Its glacier, measured over 1600 hectares, is the biggest glacier fully comprised in Italian territory.

Description
Douglas Freshfield gives this description from the summit of the Presanella, which he ascended for the first time (September 17, 1864):

First ascent

The summit of Adamello was conquered for the first time by a young  Bohemian climber, Julius von Payer, along with a mountain guide from Val Rendena, Girolamo Botteri, on 16 September 1864. The next day, the two climbers conquered the neighboring Presanella (3558 m above sea level), but were disappointed to find that a team assembled by Douglas Freshfield had preceded them by three weeks.

The team that supported Payer and Botteri was composed, in addition to them, by another mountain guide, Giovanni Caturani and a local porter, Antonio Bertoldi. Some sources state that Caturani, not Botteri, went with Payer to the top.
The expedition took off on September 8 and mistakenly climbed two secondary peaks of the Adamello massif, the Dosson di Genova, 3419 m, and the Corno Bianco (White Horn), 3434 m, before facing the true summit.

The same route chosen by Payer,  and Caturani is considered today as one of the easiest (although since then a lot has changed in the shape of glaciers), starting from the Val Genova, on the Trentino side, and crossing Pian di Neve (Snow Plain) to the peaks.

The first repetition, always in summer, was completed, following a similar path, by a British party, including the Londoner Douglas Freshfield and the famous Francis Fox Tuckett, with François Devouassoud, another Swiss guide, and a porter. Although they also ran the risk of making mistakes in the choice of the way, they arrived at the summit on July 3 1865, claiming to have been faster than Payer in first ascent the year before.

World War I 

During World War I the front between Austrian and Italian troops ran through the Adamello massif and both sides manned position on the summits all year round.

Climbing routes

To climb the summit of Adamello's main peak, there is not really a single Normal route (Via Normale in Italian). It is a short climb from the Pian di Neve to the summit, but the route to reach and cross the Pian di Neve depends on the valley chosen as the starting point.

The first climbers started from the Val Genova and went up the Mandrone glacier. This is still one of the most travelled ways to the top from the Trentino side, and apart from the need to use glacier equipment and pay attention to the objective pitfalls that ice implies, it is a long and arduous walk, technically elementary.

Panorama

References

Mountains of the Alps
Alpine three-thousanders
Mountains of Lombardy
Three-thousanders of Italy